Banr (Pashto: بنړ) is an administrative unit, known as Union council or Wards in Tehsil Babuzai, of Swat District in the Khyber Pakhtunkhwa province of Pakistan. It is located near Mingora.

According to Khyber Pakhtunkhwa Local Government Act 2013. District Swat has 67 Wards, of which total amount of Village Councils is 170, and Neighbourhood Councils is 44.

Banr is Territorial  Ward, which is further divided in two Neighbourhood Councils:
 Banr Nawakili (Neighbourhood Council)
 Banr (Neighbourhood Council)

See also 
 Babuzai
 Shahdara, Swat
 Swat District

References

External links
 Khyber-Pakhtunkhwa Government website section on Lower Dir
 United Nations
 Hajjinfo.org Uploads
 PBS paiman.jsi.com 
 Neighbourhood Council

Swat District
Populated places in Swat District
Union councils of Khyber Pakhtunkhwa
Union Councils of Swat District